Westfield Southcenter, formerly known as Southcenter Mall, is a shopping mall located in Tukwila, Washington, United States. Owned by Unibail-Rodamco-Westfield, it is the largest shopping center in Washington state and the Pacific Northwest. The mall is anchored by Macy's (formerly The Bon Marché), JCPenney, Nordstrom, and Sears (formerly Frederick & Nelson), and also features an AMC movie theater, which opened in 2000. The mall's Sears is one of two remaining in Washington state and among the last 28 stores.

History

Early history and construction: 1956–1968

In early 1956, three officials from Seattle's Northgate Shopping Center - James Douglas, president of Northgate Co., Wells McCurdy, Douglas' assistant, and Rex Allison, the vice president of Allied Department Stores - formed the Southcenter Corporation as a subsidiary of Allied. Their goal was to eventually build a large shopping center south of downtown Seattle that would match the success of their own Northgate and they began to search for a site, preferably of at least 100 acres. The site they chose was part of what was known as the Andover Tract, an  area of former pasture land being developed by the Port of Seattle for industrial use. In anticipation of the developments, the entire area (947 acres; 383 ha) was annexed by the city of Tukwila in November 1957. Southcenter Corporation strategically purchased  at what would eventually become the intersection of two major freeways, the Seattle-Tacoma Freeway (I-5) and I-405. The construction schedule of the mall was dependent on the construction of the freeways.

Excavation at the site began in early 1967, and construction of the $30 million shopping center began in the summer of that year. John Graham & Company, a Seattle firm that also designed the original Northgate and Tacoma Malls, was announced as the architect for the project. Even with four labor strikes slowing work down, construction was largely completed  by May 1968; work on the interior continued until the day before the mall's opening. In total, 25 main contractors and 50 subcontractors were involved in the construction. The concrete terrazzo floors of the mall, which were a last-minute addition, were said to be the largest in area (85,000 square feet) in the entire Puget Sound region. 500 cubic yards of sand, 3,000 100-pound sacks of gray cement, 3,000 100-pound (45 kg) sacks of white cement and 5,000 100-pound (45 kg) sacks of brown marble chips were required to make the cement-like mixture for the floors.

The grand opening was held on July 31, 1968, at 11 a.m., with then-governor Dan Evans as the key speaker. At  with 92 stores and 3,600 employees, it was the largest shopping mall in the region.

Westfield: since 2002

In early 2002, the mall was purchased by the Westfield Group and renamed "Westfield Southcenter".

On July 22, 2010, Seafood City opened in the former Mervyn's space, and in 2014 The Container Store opened in the former Borders Books space. That same year the Westfield Group split its assets, with malls in North America and Europe being moved into the Westfield Corporation. In 2015, it was announced that the Rainforest Cafe would close in January 2016. It was replaced by a Chinese restaurant, Din Tai Fung, which opened in April 2017.

In December 2017, Westfield Corporation was purchased by the European shopping center giant Unibail-Rodamco, which appended its name to Unibail-Rodamco-Westfield. Its properties in North America and Europe were unified under the Westfield brand.

References

External links
Official website
Mall is the area's main attraction, Seattle Post-Intelligencer
New Official Westfield Southcenter website with details of mall expansion

Shopping malls in King County, Washington
Southcenter
Shopping malls established in 1968
1968 establishments in Washington (state)